Çakmak Dam is a dam in Samsun Province, Turkey, built between 1985 and 1988. The development was backed by the Turkish State Hydraulic Works.

See also
List of dams and reservoirs in Turkey

External links
DSI directory, State Hydraulic Works (Turkey), Retrieved December 16, 2009

Dams in Samsun Province